The Ginetta GT4 Supercup is a one-make racing, Sports car racing series based in the United Kingdom, using identical Ginetta G50 and G55 sports cars. The championship currently supports the British Touring Car Championship (BTCC).

The championship began as the Ginetta G50 Cup in 2008, supporting the British Formula Three Championship and British GT Championship. In 2009 it moved to support the BTCC. In 2011, with the introduction of the Ginetta G55, the championship became the Ginetta GT Supercup, running a multi class format for the two different cars. For the 2014 season, the championship was rebranded as the Ginetta GT4 Supercup, with both the G50 and G55 cars running in a single, performance balanced class.

Racing car
The regulations include sealed engines, gearboxes and differentials. This prevents expensive development of the cars and ensures that all of the cars are identical, helping to provide close racing. 

The Ginetta G55 Cup was introduced in 2011, the Ginetta G55 offered a 3.7 litre V6 engine and 380 BHP. 

Trained engineer Tomlinson himself penned the base specification for the Ginetta G50 which was produced to celebrate 50 years of Ginetta production. Home to a 3.5 litre V6 engine and 300 BHP, it has since become a successful GT4 car.

Race weekend
Meetings are usually made up of three 20-minute races. The grid for the first race is determined by a 20-minute qualifying session. The results of the first race forms the grid for the second race. The grid for the third race is decided by reversing between 4 and 6 of the top 10 finishers from the second race.

2019 Race Circuits
The current racing circuits are:
 Brands Hatch (Indy), Kent
 Donington Park (national), Leicestershire
 Croft, North Yorkshire
 Oulton Park (International), Cheshire
 Thruxton, Hampshire
 Knockhill, Fife
 Silverstone (National), Northamptonshire
 Brands Hatch (Grand Prix), Kent

Champions

See also
 Ginetta Junior Championship

References

External links
G50 Cup at Ginetta Cars

Auto racing series in the United Kingdom
One-make series
Sports car racing series
Supercup